Jonathan Peter Tsipis (born November 7, 1972) is the former head coach of the Wisconsin Badgers women's basketball team.

Career
He was previously the head coach of the George Washington University women's basketball team, where he had an overall record of 92–38 in four years. During the 2014–15 season he led George Washington to an overall record of 29–4 and A10 regular season and tournament championships. He was named the A10 Coach of the Year at the end of the 2014–2015 regular season. The team made the 2015 and 2016 NCAA tournaments.

Prior to becoming the head coach at George Washington University he was an assistant coach, and then associate head coach, for the Notre Dame women's basketball team. During his time there the team went 228–77 (.748) and reached the NCAA tournament every year, highlighted by three Sweet Sixteens (2004, 2008, 2010) and two National Championship games (2011, 2012).

On March 23, 2016, Tsipis was introduced as the seventh head coach in Wisconsin women's basketball history. He signed a five-year contract through 2021. In the first-year of the contract, he was paid $633,000. He was paid $625,000 in 2017–18 and was paid $650,000 for the remaining duration of the contract. In 2018, Wisconsin extended Tsipis through the 2022–23 season. On March 9, 2021, Wisconsin fired Tsipis.

Tsipis signed one recruit after the conclusion of his first year as head coach at Wisconsin, Niya Beverley. His recruiting class for the 2018–2019 season featured three-top 100 players and was one of the highest ranked classes in program history, with another top 100 player transferring to Wisconsin.

Head coaching record

References 

1972 births
Living people
American women's basketball coaches
Basketball coaches from Ohio
Cornell Big Red men's basketball coaches
Elon Phoenix men's basketball coaches
George Washington Colonials women's basketball coaches
Notre Dame Fighting Irish women's basketball coaches
Sportspeople from Cleveland
University of North Carolina at Chapel Hill alumni
Wisconsin Badgers women's basketball coaches